Julia L. Patterson (born December 1, 1953) is an American politician from Washington. She is a former member of the King County Council, Washington State Senate, Washington House of Representatives, and the SeaTac City Council.

Education 
Patterson earned a two Bachelor of Arts degrees, from the University of Washington and Washington State University.

Career 
Patterson began her political career by assisting in the effort to incorporate the City of SeaTac, Washington. In 1989, she was elected as a founding member of the SeaTac City Council. Subsequently, she served three terms as a State Representative and two terms as a State Senator in the Washington State Legislature, representing Washington's 33rd Legislative District.

For 12 years, Patterson served as a member of the King County Council, representing District Five, which consists of portions of South King County, including Kent, Des Moines, Burien, Seatac and Renton. Patterson also served as a Sound Transit board member and chair of the Transportation Policy Board of the Puget Sound Regional Council.

In 2013, Patterson announced that she would not run for a fourth term on the King County Council. In 2004, Patterson was nominated to serve on the Washington State Gambling Commission. She now serves as Vice Chair of the commission, and her term is set to expire in 2024.

Patterson has written several op-ed columns for The Seattle Times.

References

Living people
1953 births
King County Councillors
Members of the Washington House of Representatives
Washington (state) state senators
Women state legislators in Washington (state)
University of Washington College of Arts and Sciences alumni
Washington State University alumni
People from SeaTac, Washington
21st-century American women